Glenn Martin "Shake & Bake" Doughty (born January 30, 1951) is a former American football player.  He played college football as a tailback and wingback for the University of Michigan from 1969 to 1971 and professional football as a wide receiver for the Baltimore Colts from 1972 to 1979. Doughty later built and managed Baltimore's iconic Shake & Bake Family Fun Center in 1982. In 1994, he co-founded Career Information & Training Network (CITN), a St. Louis based company that produces videos designed to show positive multicultural career role models for use in K-12 schools, colleges and corporate America.

Early years
Doughty was born  in Detroit, Michigan, in 1951. He attended Pershing High School.

Glenn was born to Otis and Bessie Doughty natives of Nashville and Spring City respectively. Following Otis Doughty's military service he moved his family to Detroit Michigan.   Glenn's introduction to organized sports began with the East Detroit Shamrocks where he played running back and led his team to its first undefeated Championship season. Glenn and Ron Banks were the first African Americans to play for the team. Banks became the founding member of the world famous singing group The Drematics. Glenn then played for the Westside Cubs.

In 1965 at the age of 14 Glenn became the starting defensive end for the Pershing Doughboys.  As a senior Glenn was named captain of the 6-0 undefeated champion Doughboys earned Eastside Detroit MVP honors and Detroit News All City and All State Honers .  Doughty was a member of the 1967 Pershing basketball team that was coached by Hall of Fame coach Will Robinson. The team featured five players who  went on to careers in pro sports. Doughty NFL Baltimore Colts,  Spencer Haywood NBA Hall of Fame, Ralph Simpson Denver Nugetts. Marvin Lane Detroit Tigers and Paul Seal NFL San Francisco 49'ers.  The Detroit Free Press named this team Number 1 in the history of Michigan basketball.

As an all around athlete Glenn lead the Doughboys baseball team to an Eastside Detroit baseball championship with a 427 batting average.

University of Michigan

Doughty played tailback and wingback for the University of Michigan from 1969 to 1971.  He gained 2,347 all-purpose yards for the Wolverines, including 1,464 rushing yards, 518 receiving yards, and 365 yards on kickoff returns. Doughty earned freshman of the year honors by winning the John Maulbetsch award.

Doughty made his debut for Michigan under first-year head coach Bo Schembechler in 1969.

The Bleacher Report's story "The Mellow Men of Michigan: Bo Schembechler's Gridiron Sons" traces the origins of Doughty and his six groundbreaking Wolverine classmates Billy Taylor, Reggie McKenzie, Thom Darden, Butch Carpenter, Mike Taylor and Mike Oldham.  In 1968, these young men became the largest group of African American athletes on scholarship in Michigan history.  In Doughty's first two games for Michigan (also Schembechler's first two games as Michigan's head coach), he rushed for 138 yards (including an 80-yard touchdown run on his first carry) in a 42–14 win against Vanderbilt and 191 yards in a 45–7 win against Washington.  Doughty sustained injuries early in the season that slowed him down and allowed Billy Taylor to move from backup to starting tailback.  Doughty did rush for 100 yards one more time during the 1969 season, in a 51–6 win against Iowa.  He totaled 732 yards for the 1969 Michigan Wolverines football team. Doughty sustained an injury on Christmas Day while practicing for the 1970 Rose Bowl.  Doughty was moved to the wingback position and started all 12 games at that position for the 1970 and  1971 Michigan Wolverines football team.  He scored three touchdowns in a 35–6 victory over Illinois in October 1971.

After the 1971 season, Doughty was selected by UPI as a second-team wide receiver on the 1971 All-Big Ten Conference football team. Doughty was selected to play on the 1972 Coaches All American and College All Star Team as the starting wide receiver.

Doughty graduated from Michigan in 1972 with a bachelor of science degree in education.

Professional football
Doughty played professional football as wide receiver for the Baltimore Colts from 1972 to 1979. In 1973 he was named Colts Offensive Player of the year leading the AFC with 23 yards per catch. He appeared in 103 games for the Colts, totaling 219 receptions for 3,547 yards and 24 touchdowns. He earned the nickname "Shake and Bake" during his years with the Colts, and the nickname was also extended to the 1975 Baltimore Colts offense. The Colts 10-4 record was the greatest NFL turn around season in history after going 2-12 in 1974. Doughty led the team in receiving yardage with 666 yards. Doughty helped lead the Colts for the first time in the team’s history to three straight Eastern Divisional Championships 1975-1977. In his first playoff game Doughty scored the only Colts touchdown and led the Colts in receiving yards with 63 in their loss to the 1974 Super Bowl Champion Pittsburgh Steelers 24-10. 

In 1979, Doughty left the team for two days claiming that he was being subtly downgraded by Colts' coach Ted Marchibroda.  The Baltimore Afro-American referred to the Colts' treatment of Doughty as "business as usual at Memorial Stadium," noting that Raymond Chester had complained the prior year that "an attitude of racism" on the Colts caused quarterback Bert Jones to "look away" from him.  Doughty was cut by the Colts in August 1980 after struggling during the pre-season with a hamstring pull.  He was the sixth leading receiver in Colts' history when his NFL career ended.

Shake and Bake Family Fun Center
After retiring from the Colts, Doughty announced plans to build the Shake and Bake Family Recreation Center in the Upton neighborhood of Baltimore. The project was supported by a $3.5 million loan from the City of Baltimore.  Disputes over financing jeopardized the project in 1982, and disputes with construction workers also drew press coverage.  The project was ultimately built with $4.7 million in development loans from the City of Baltimore, $150,000 invested by Doughty, and $1.2 million invested by four limited partners.

When the project, renamed the Shake and Bake Family Fun Center, opened in October 1982 managed by Doughty came in on time and under budget, Doughty called it a dream come true and "my Super Bowl ring".  The $5.2 million project was described by the Baltimore Afro-American as "Doughty's gift to the inner city."  The  structure included a 40-lane bowling alley, a  roller-skating rink, a sporting goods store, an "electronic game arcade," and two fast-food restaurants.  In February 1984, Black Enterprise magazine wrote a story on the center, noting that the center had grossed $1 million in its first year and received 10,000 visits per week.  The article concluded: "The complex is such a success that mayors from large cities around the U.S., studying inner city revitalization programs, have visited it."

In January 1985, shootings at the center and financial difficulties drew negative press to the project.  After loan delinquencies mounted in 1987 Doughty and his limited partners sold the facility to the City. .   In 2017 Shake and Bake was featured in "Baltimore: The Rise of Charm City" a radio series by WEAA of Morgan State University that described Shake and Bake as "one of Baltimore's iconic structures that was built by African Americans and founded by Glenn Doughty". Over one million patrons have passed through the center over the thirty years of operation.

On March 23, 2018 Mayor Cathy Pugh and Glenn Doughty joined together with state dignitaries and citizens from the Upton neighborhood celebrated the grand reopening of Shake and Bake. The theme was "The Bake is Back". The city of Baltimore and the state of Maryland committed nearly $5 million in new funding to upgrade the center.  The 17,000 sq. ft. Roller rink is considered by many to be the best in the nation.

Later years
In 1985 Doughty moved with his family to St. Louis, Missouri.  He co-founded a company called Takeoff Video Educational Excellence.  The company produced videos designed to show positive multicultural role models for use in schools.  In 1994, Takeoff was reorganized as Career Information Training Network.  Doughty is the company's CEO.

References

1951 births
Living people
Pershing High School alumni
American football wide receivers
Michigan Wolverines football players
Baltimore Colts players
Players of American football from Detroit